Scoliacma pasteophara is a moth in the family Erebidae. It was described by Alfred Jefferis Turner in 1940. It is found in Australia, where it has been recorded from Western Australia.

References

Moths described in 1940
Lithosiina